The 1993–94 Winnipeg Jets season was the team's 22nd season of operation and their 15th in the National Hockey League (NHL). The Jets finished 12th in the Western Conference and failed to qualify for the playoffs for the first time since 1991.

Off-season
With the NHL undergoing a realignment during the 1993 off-season, the Jets were moved from the Smythe Division into the newly created Central Division in the Western Conference. Joining the Jets in the Central Division were the Chicago Blackhawks, Dallas Stars, Detroit Red Wings, St. Louis Blues and Toronto Maple Leafs. The NHL also changed their playoff format, as the top eight teams in each conference would qualify for the post-season, instead of the top four teams in each division.

On June 11, 1993, the Jets acquired Stephane Beauregard from the Philadelphia Flyers in exchange for future considerations. Beauregard, who played with Winnipeg from 1989 to 1992, had a 3–9–0 record and a 4.41 goals against average in 16 games in the 1992–93 season with Philadelphia. On the same day, the Jets acquired Paul Ysebaert and Alan Kerr from the Detroit Red Wings in exchange for Aaron Ward and the Jets' fourth-round pick in the 1993 NHL Entry Draft. Ysebaert had 34 goals and 62 points in 80 games with the Red Wings in 1992–93, and in 1991–92, Ysebaert had an NHL best +44 rating with the Red Wings. Kerr had 3 goals and 11 points in 58 games with the Red Wings in 1992–93.

At the 1993 NHL Entry Draft, held on June 26, 1993, the Jets and Florida Panthers made a trade, as Winnipeg acquired the Panthers' second-round pick in the draft for the Jets' second- and third-round pick at the same draft. With their first-round pick, 15th overall, the Jets selected Mats Lindgren from Skellefteå AIK in Sweden. Lindgren had 20 goals and 38 points in 32 games for the club in the 1992–93 season. Another notable pick the club made was Michal Grosek in the sixth round.

On June 30, 1993, the Jets traded Kris Draper to the Detroit Red Wings in exchange for future considerations, which turned out to be $1.

During training camp, on September 24, 1993, the club traded Phil Housley to the St. Louis Blues in exchange for Nelson Emerson and Stephane Quintal. Emerson had 22 goals and 73 points in 82 games with the Blues during the 1992–93 season, while Quintal had 1 goal and 11 points in 75 games.

Regular season
In November, Dean Kennedy was replaced as captain by forward Keith Tkachuk.

Final standings

Schedule and results

Player statistics

Regular season
Scoring

Goaltending

Awards and records

Transactions

Trades

Free agents

Draft picks
Winnipeg's draft picks at the 1993 NHL Entry Draft held at the Quebec Coliseum in Quebec City, Quebec.

Farm teams

See also
 1993–94 NHL season

References

External links

W
W
Winnipeg Jets (1972–1996) seasons